Phasgonophora is a genus of chalcidid wasps in the family Chalcididae. There are at least two described species in Phasgonophora.

Species
These two species belong to the genus Phasgonophora:
 Phasgonophora rugithorax Strand, 1912 c g
 Phasgonophora sulcata Westwood, 1832 c g b
Data sources: i = ITIS, c = Catalogue of Life, g = GBIF, b = Bugguide.net

References

Further reading

External links

 

Parasitic wasps
Chalcidoidea